Corey Anderson may refer to:
Corey Anderson (fighter) (born 1989), American mixed martial artist
Corey Anderson (cricketer) (born 1990), New Zealand cricketer
Corey Anderson (parathlete) (born 2000), Australian javelin thrower